
This is a complete List of National Historic Landmarks in Maine.  The United States National Historic Landmark program is operated under the auspices of the National Park Service, and recognizes structures, districts, objects, and similar resources according to a list of criteria of national significance. The state of Maine is home to 44 of these landmarks, displaying the state's maritime heritage, as well as literary, archeological, religious, and a wide array of other themes.

One site in the state, Wickyup, had its landmark designation withdrawn after it was destroyed by fire, and another, the schooner Roseway, was relocated to Boston, Massachusetts.  The state is also the location of the National Park Service's only International Historic Site, the St. Croix Island International Historic Site, important in both U.S. and Canadian history as the site of the first French settlement of Acadia in 1603.

National Historic Landmarks

|}

Listings formerly in Maine

See also
National Register of Historic Places listings in Maine
List of National Historic Landmarks by state
Historic preservation
National Register of Historic Places
History of Maine

References

External links
National Historic Landmark Program at the National Park Service
Lists of National Historic Landmarks

Maine
 
National Historic Landmarks
National Historic Landmarks